The Sentinel Butte Formation is a geologic formation of Paleocene age in the Williston Basin of western North Dakota. It preserves significant assemblages of non-marine plant and animal fossils.

See also 
 List of fossiliferous stratigraphic units in North Dakota
 Paleontology in North Dakota

References 

Paleogene geology of North Dakota
Thanetian Stage